Banksia ericifolia subsp. macrantha is a subspecies of Banksia ericifolia. It is native to New South Wales.

References

 
 

ericifolia subsp. macrantha
Flora of New South Wales
Plant subspecies